Shelby Township is a township in Shelby County, Iowa. There are 872 people and 22.1 people per square mile in Shelby Township. The total area is 39.5 square miles.

References

Townships in Shelby County, Iowa
Townships in Iowa